Brummell's Inn is a historic inn and tavern located near Thomasville, Davidson County, North Carolina. It was originally constructed as a small log house in the late-18th / early-19th century.  It was expanded about 1814 in a vernacular Late Georgian / Early Federal style, with later additions.  The resultant building is two-stories and eight bays wide.  Also on the property are a contributing smokehouse, barn, and cemetery.  The stagecoach inn operated into the 1850s, after which it was used as a dwelling house.

It was added to the National Register of Historic Places in 1980.

References

Houses on the National Register of Historic Places in North Carolina
Georgian architecture in North Carolina
Federal architecture in North Carolina
Houses completed in 1814
Houses in Davidson County, North Carolina
National Register of Historic Places in Davidson County, North Carolina